Sarah Goodridge (February 5, 1788 – December 28, 1853; also referred to as Sarah Goodrich) was an American painter who specialized in portrait miniatures. She was the older sister of Elizabeth Goodridge, also an American miniaturist.

Life
Goodridge was born in Templeton, Massachusetts, the sixth child and third daughter of Ebenezer Goodridge and his wife Beulah Childs. At an early age, she began drawing and showed an aptitude for art. Women's educational opportunities were limited at the time and where Goodridge lived, so she was largely a self-taught artist. She attended the local district school. Her early sketches of people around her were on birch bark since she lacked the resources to purchase paper. She stayed with her brother, William M. Goodrich, for a few months in Milton, and attended a boarding school there.  She also got a few drawing lessons in Boston where she accompanied her brother.  In Boston, she also met Gilbert Stuart who took an interest in her work.

In 1820, she went to live with her sister Eliza in Boston and began receiving lessons and painting miniature portraits. She earned enough from commissions to support herself and her family for several decades. She eventually specialized in miniatures painted on ivory, getting lessons from a Hartford miniaturist, almost certainly Elkanah Tisdale.
Her paintings were exhibited in Boston and Washington, D.C. After her eyesight failed in 1851, she retired from painting and settled in Reading, Massachusetts.
 
Goodridge became well known for her portraits of politician Daniel Webster and fellow artist Gilbert Stuart. Among Goodridge's works is a miniature portrait of her own bared breasts, titled Beauty Revealed, now in the Metropolitan Museum of Art in New York. The miniature was painted on a sliver of ivory that measured just 2 5/8 by 3 1/8 inches. Executed in 1828, it was presented by the artist to her close friend, correspondent, and occasional subject, Daniel Webster.  The work was included in the retrospective "The Philippe de Montebello Years: Curators Celebrate Three Decades of Acquisitions." It was the inspiration for a miniature painted by the fictional heroine of Blindspot: A Novel (New York, 2008), by Jane Kamensky and Jill Lepore.

References

Footnotes

Sources

 Lamothe, Lori. "A Shocking Miniature and a Mysterious Connection: The story of Sarah Goodridge and Daniel Webster" in The Collector.

1788 births
1853 deaths
American women painters
People from Templeton, Massachusetts
Portrait miniaturists
Artists from Boston
19th century in Boston
Painters from Massachusetts
19th-century American painters